Dipterocarpus kunstleri grows as a canopy tree up to  tall, with a trunk diameter of up to . Bark is orange-brown. Habitat is mixed dipterocarp forest from sea-level to  altitude. D. kunstleri is found in Sumatra, Peninsular Malaysia, Borneo and the Philippines.

References

kunstleri
Trees of Sumatra
Trees of Peninsular Malaysia
Trees of Borneo
Trees of the Philippines
Plants described in 1893
Critically endangered flora of Asia
Flora of Sabah